Tchanturia is a Georgian surname. Notable people with the surname include:
Kate Tchanturia (born 1960), English psychologist
Romani Tchanturia (born 1996), Georgian football player

Surnames of Georgian origin
Georgian-language surnames
Surnames of Abkhazian origin